Baranliq-e Hoseyn Khan (also Romanized as Baranlīq-e Ḩoseyn Khān; also known as Baranlaq-e Ḩoseyn Khān, Baranlīq-e ‘Olyā, and Bernalīq-e Ḩoseyn Khān) is a village in Garmeh-ye Jonubi Rural District, in the Central District of Meyaneh County, East Azerbaijan Province, Iran. At the 2006 census, its population was 145, in 36 families.

References 

Populated places in Meyaneh County